Dixon Correctional Institute (DCI) is a prison facility in Jackson, Louisiana.

The housing of the warden of Dixon is in a pastoral setting by a lake.

History
Dixon, which opened in 1976, was the first medium security prison in Louisiana. 7.5% of Dixon's beds are classified as "maximum security."

Burl Cain served as the warden of DCI until he was named in the same position at Angola. By 1997 Cain continued to live at DCI even though he was by that time the warden of Angola. LeBlanc later became the Secretary of Corrections of Louisiana.

Its current warden is Steve Rader. Another former Dixon warden is Richard Stalder of Zachary, who was the secretary of the Louisiana Department of Public Safety and Corrections from 1992 to 2008.

Around 2003 the prison held boxing matches for prisoners.

Notable inmates
 Torrence Hatch (Lil Boosie)
 Vince Marinello

Notes

Official website

Official website

Prisons in Louisiana
1976 establishments in Louisiana
Buildings and structures in East Feliciana Parish, Louisiana